In 2017, the Kenya Nuclear Electrification Board (Kneb) estimated that a 1,000 MW nuclear plant could be operational by 2027 and cost Ksh500-600 billion ($5-$6 billion), to be located near a large body of water, such as the Indian Ocean, Lake Victoria or Lake Turkana.

Background
In September 2010 Former Energy and Petroleum Ministry PS Patrick Nyoike announced that Kenya aimed to build a 1,000 MW nuclear power plant between 2017 and 2022. 
The projected cost using South Korean technology was US$3.5 billion.
Nuclear and renewable sources of energy such as wind, solar and geothermal plants could play a major role in helping Kenya achieve middle income status, as the reduction of carbon emissions becomes a higher priority.

Nuclear energy programme
Kenya has embarked on a programme to see the country generate 1 GW (1,000 MW) from nuclear sources between 2020 and 2022. By 2030 Kenya was slated to have installed a capacity of 4 GW of nuclear energy, generating about 19% of Kenya's energy needs, meaning that nuclear power would be the second largest source of energy in Kenya coming second after geothermal power which is a clean form of energy.

The Kenya Nuclear Electricity Board (NuPEA) is in charge of spearheading this sector in the country.

See also 
 Geothermal power in Kenya
 Wind power in Kenya

References

External links
 Kenya Nuclear Electricity Board
 Renewable Energy Portal (Kenya)
 Ministry of Energy and Petroleum (Kenya)
 Energy Regulatory Commission (Kenya)
 Geothermal Development Company (Kenya)
 Kenya Power
 KenGen

Kenya
Kenya
Nuclear technology in Kenya
 
Infrastructure in Kenya
Energy companies of Kenya